In applied mathematics, Loubignac iteration is an iterative method in finite element methods. It gives continuous stress field. It is named after Gilles Loubignac, who published the method in 1977.

References
 Loubignac's paper

Continuum mechanics
Finite element method
Numerical differential equations
Partial differential equations
Structural analysis